Shirgaytu (Şırgaytı) is a rural locality (a selo) in Shebalinsky District, the Altai Republic, Russia. The population was 511 as of 2016. There are 10 streets.

Geography 
Shirgaytu is located 104 km southwest of Shebalino (the district's administrative centre) by road. Baragash is the nearest rural locality.

References 

Rural localities in Shebalinsky District